Shepherd in a Sheepskin Vest is a studio album by American musician Bill Callahan, released on June 14, 2019, by Drag City. It is the sixth studio album released under his own name, and seventeenth overall when including LPs released as Smog.

Shepherd in a Sheepskin Vest is a double album with twenty tracks and over sixty-three minutes in length, making it Callahan's longest album to date. The album received favorable reviews, with Pitchfork contributing editor Jayson Greene referring to it as a "highlight of his career".

Release and promotion
The album was announced on May 2, 2019. The first three sides of the album were released digitally weeks apart before the album's release. The first side was released on May 23, 2019, the second side on May 30, 2019, and the third on June 6, 2019.

The album was premiered for early streaming through NPR's First Listen series starting on June 6, 2019.

Critical reception

Shepherd in a Sheepskin Vest received positive reviews from critics upon its release. At Metacritic, which assigns a normalized rating out of 100 to reviews from mainstream publications, the album received an average score of 88, based on 22 reviews.

Laura Snapes of The Guardian praised the album as a "brilliantly sly celebration of family and the infinite". In his review for Pitchfork, Jayson Greene called the album "his warmest, his most generous, possibly his most profound. It is his longest, for sure, lounging comfortably across four sides of vinyl, none of it wasted. It is a high note, fond and deep and sustained."

Track listing

Personnel
Credits adapted from liner notes.

Musicians
 Bill Callahan – vocals, acoustic guitar, Moog synthesizer, percussion, bowed psaltery, bowed banjo, harmonica, Wurlitzer electric piano, Casio SK-1, drum machine, mellotron, piano, kalimba, organ, bells
 Brian Beattie – upright bass, acoustic bass, electric upright bass , percussion, piano, pump organ, Hammond organ, Moog synthesizer, mellotron, celesta, marimbula, bells
 Matt Kinsey – acoustic guitar, percussion
 Adam Jones – drumkit
 Dony Wynn – drumkit 
 Gary Newcomb – lap steel guitar
 Hanly Banks Callahan – backing vocals 
 Tori Olds – backing vocals 

Technical
 Brian Beattie – recording, mixing
 JJ Golden – mastering

Packaging
 Joanna Skumanich – front and back cover drawings
 Dan Osborn – layout

Charts

References

2019 albums
Drag City (record label) albums
Bill Callahan (musician) albums